Ashfield School is a large secondary school with academy status located in Kirkby-in-Ashfield, Nottinghamshire, England, which educates pupils with ages 11–19.

The school has approximately 2,500 students, split into six houses – Trent, Chesterfield, Thoroton, Byron, Hargreaves and Coates. The six houses have students from all year groups except those who are from the sixth form.

The current headteacher of the school is Mr J. Maher, who replaced Mr Dick Vasey in 2017, after the latter became CEO of the Two Counties Trust, of which Ashfield School is a part.

Ashfield School was chosen as a training ground for the London 2012 Olympics.

History 
Built in 1964 as Nottinghamshire's first purpose built comprehensive school, Ashfield School now has a self-contained  rural campus. Facilities include computer suites, an ICT Centre, on-site sports facilities including four gymnasiums, tennis courts, all weather sports fields, running track and a swimming pool. Other resources on-site include music studios, a tiered theatre and drama complex, photographic darkroom, print making and ceramics studios, fifteen science laboratories, a business centre, a CAD/CAM centre, library and careers library.

2003 saw the opening of the JLC (known as the ATE Centre from 2003-2016), a large cafeteria for students to eat in.

In 2007, the sixth form (Post 16) centre opened, with a large cafeteria-like area, and over 30 classrooms, for both A Level and vocational studies.

2012 saw the closure of the music block next to the sixth form centre. This was replaced in 2013 by the Resource Centre, an extension of the sixth form which includes 3 classrooms (with walls that can slide to create one large room) and a library/study area. The latter is exclusive to sixth form students.

A new drama/music block was built in late 2012, between the science and maths blocks, as the previous block had been removed to make way for the Resource Centre.

Summer 2020 saw an extension onto one of the science blocks, which saw the addition of 3 new science classrooms.

Ashfield Skills Centre (ASC) 
The Ashfield Skills Centre is a £7.1million project which delivers six learning environments. The centre includes:
 Eight vocational units equipped to industry standard specification to mimic an industrial or commercial context. Course content and delivery are provided by industrial and commercial training providers in textiles, business, child care, health and beauty and ICT.
 Three industrial units: deliver vocational courses in construction, plumbing, automotive, electrical, catering and hospitality courses delivered by industrial training providers RAC, Carillion and Charnwood.
 Resource Centre: built in 2013, this million pound extension offers a study area for all sixth form students.

Notable Pupils 

 Lee Anderson, British MP and Deputy Chairman of the Conservative Party.
 Chris Gascoyne, actor.
 James Graham, playwright and screenwriter.
 Oliver Hynd, a Paralympic swimmer, with a gold medal in the 400m freestyle at the 2016 Summer Olympics
 Sam Hynd, a former Paralympic swimmer.
 Jimmy Walker, footballer.

References

External links 
 Ashfield Comprehensive School profile provided by the BBC

Academies in Nottinghamshire
Kirkby-in-Ashfield
Educational institutions established in 1964
Secondary schools in Nottinghamshire
Training schools in England
1964 establishments in England